Riya Bhatia (born 24 September 1997) is a professional Indian tennis player.

Bhatia has career-high WTA rankings of 338 in singles, achieved on 2 March 2020, and 387 in doubles, reached on 17 May 2021. She has won three singles and three doubles titles at tournaments if the ITF Women's Circuit.

Playing for India Fed Cup team, Bhatia has a win–loss record of 1–3.
She also represented her country at the 2018 Asian Games in Palembang.

Additionally, she has won two national titles: hardcourt and grass-court national championships in 2016.

ITF Circuit finals

Singles: 7 (3 titles, 4 runner-ups)

Doubles: 17 (3 titles, 14 runner-ups)

External links
 
 
 

1997 births
Living people
Indian female tennis players
Racket sportspeople from Haryana
Sportswomen from Haryana